Carlos José Mata Figueroa is a former Defence Minister of Venezuela from January 2010 to January 2012) and the Chief of the Venezuelan armed forces. He holds the rank of General in the Venezuelan Army.

References

Year of birth missing (living people)
Living people
Venezuelan generals
Venezuelan politicians
Venezuelan Ministers of Defense
United Socialist Party of Venezuela politicians
Governors of Nueva Esparta